Mildred Jeannette Dolson (later Cavill, August 13, 1918 – July 17, 2004) was a Canadian athlete who competed in the 1936 Summer Olympics.

She was born in Toronto, Ontario, Canada and died in North Palm Beach, Florida, United States.

In 1936 she won the bronze medal in the 4×100 metres relay event with her team mates Dorothy Brookshaw, Hilda Cameron and Aileen Meagher. In the 100 metre competition she was eliminated in the semi-finals.

At the 1938 Empire Games she was a member of the Canadian team which won the silver medal in the 110-220-110 yards relay contest and the bronze medal in the 220-110-220-110 yards relay event. She also won the bronze medal in the 100 yards competition and in the 220 yards contest she was eliminated in the semi-finals.

In 1939 Jeanette was awarded the Velma Springstead Trophy (Canada's Outstanding Female Athlete) for Track and Field.

External links
 
 

1918 births
2004 deaths
Canadian female sprinters
Athletes from Toronto
Athletes (track and field) at the 1936 Summer Olympics
Athletes (track and field) at the 1938 British Empire Games
Commonwealth Games bronze medallists for Canada
Commonwealth Games silver medallists for Canada
Olympic bronze medalists for Canada
Olympic track and field athletes of Canada
Commonwealth Games medallists in athletics
Medalists at the 1936 Summer Olympics
Olympic bronze medalists in athletics (track and field)
People from North Palm Beach, Florida
Olympic female sprinters
Canadian expatriates in the United States
Medallists at the 1938 British Empire Games